Pierre Dolbeault (October 10, 1924 – June 12, 2015) was a French mathematician.

Dolbeault studied with Henri Cartan and graduated in 1944 from the École Normale Supérieure. He completed his Ph.D. at the University of Paris in 1955 under the supervision of Cartan, with a dissertation titled Formes différentielles et cohomologie sur une variété analytique complexe.

He taught in the 1950s at the University of Montpellier and the University of Bordeaux, and later at the Pierre and Marie Curie University (Jussieu). Together with Pierre Lelong and Henri Skoda he held an Analysis seminar in Paris.

Dolbeault cohomology is named after him, and so is the Dolbeault theorem.

External links
 Pierre Dolbeault's professional webpage
 "On the Mathematical Works of Pierre Dolbeault", EMS Newsletter, March 2016
 

1924 births
2015 deaths
20th-century French mathematicians
21st-century French mathematicians
École Normale Supérieure alumni
Complex analysts
Mathematical analysts
Academic staff of the University of Montpellier
Academic staff of the University of Bordeaux
Academic staff of Pierre and Marie Curie University